Ali Ibrahim (19 December 1971 – 28 March 2010) was an Egyptian rower who competed at four Olympic Games. He also won multiple World Rowing Cup medals, including three silver medals and two bronze medals.

Life and rowing career
Ali Ibrahim was born on 19 December 1971, in Al Sharqia, Egypt. He began rowing in 1990.

He became the most successful Egyptian rower, when he finished 8th in the men's single scull at the 1996 Olympic Games in Atlanta, Georgia, in the United States, and 6th at the 1997 World Championships in Aiguebelette, France. He competed in the single again at the 2000 Olympic Games in Sydney, Australia, and although he moved into team boats, rowing in the eight and quad for the World Championships, he competed in the single scull again at the 2004 and 2008 Olympic Games in Athens and Beijing, respectively.

Death
He died on 28 March 2010, when a speeding car hit him as he was crossing Salah Salem Street in Nasr City in Cairo, Egypt, on his way to train the Egyptian national rowing team.

Achievements and titles
World Cup Medals: 3 silver medals, 2 bronze medals

Olympic Games
1996 – 8th Atlanta – Single Sculls
2000 – 13th Sydney – Single Sculls
2004 – 14th Athens – Single Sculls
2008 – 18th Beijing – Single Sculls

World Cups
1995 – 6th WCp 1 – Hazewinkel, Single Sculls
1995 – 6th WCp 4 – Paris, Single Sculls
1995 – 10th WCp 4F – Lucerne, Single Sculls
1997 – 2nd WCp 1 – Munich, Single Sculls
1997 – 2nd WCp 2 – Paris, Single Sculls
1997 – 6th WCp 3F – Lucerne, Single Sculls
1998 – 3rd WCp 1 – Munich, Single Sculls
1998 – 2nd WCp 2 – Hazewinkel, Single Sculls
1998 – 4th WCp 3F – Lucerne, Single Sculls
1999 – 5th WCp 1 – Hazewinkel, Single Sculls
1999 – 4th WCp 2 – Vienna, Single Sculls
1999 – 9th WCp 3F – Lucerne, Single Sculls
2000 – 4th WCp 1 – Munich, Single Sculls
2000 – 9th WCp 2 – Vienna, Single Sculls
2000 – 7th WCp 3F – Lucerne, Single Sculls
2001 – 7th WCp 1 – New Jersey, Single Sculls
2002 – 3rd WCp 1 – Hazewinkel, Men's Eights
2002 – 7th WCp 2 – Lucerne, Men's Eights
2003 – 7th WCp 1 – Milan, Coxless four
2003 – 14th WCp 3F – Lucerne, Coxless four
2004 – 7th WCp 2 – Munich, Single Sculls
2006 – 7th WCp 2 – Poznan, Men's Eights
2006 – 9th WCp 3F – Lucerne, Men's Eights
2007 – 12th WCp 2 – Amsterdam, Quad scull
2008 – 8th WCp 2 – Lucerne, Quad scull
2008 – 9th WCp 3F – Poznan, Quad scull

World Championships
1995 – 17th – Tampere, Single Sculls
1997 – 6th – Aiguebelette, Single Sculls
1998 – 6th – Cologne, Single Sculls
1999 – 8th – St. Catharines, Single Sculls
2002 – 9th – Seville, Men's Eights
2003 – 12th – Milan, Men's Eights
2006 – 15th – Eton Dorney, Quad scull
2007 – 18th – Munich, Quad scull

References

External links
 
 
 

1971 births
2010 deaths
Egyptian male rowers
Olympic rowers of Egypt
Rowers at the 1996 Summer Olympics
Rowers at the 2000 Summer Olympics
Rowers at the 2004 Summer Olympics
Rowers at the 2008 Summer Olympics
African Games gold medalists for Egypt
African Games medalists in rowing
Competitors at the 2007 All-Africa Games
Road incident deaths in Egypt
21st-century Egyptian people